Barbara Bączek-Motała (born 26 July 1972 in Iława) is a Polish orienteer.

Career
As a junior, Bączek won two gold medals in the short/middle distance and classic/long distance at the 1992 Junior World Championships in Jyväskylä. She also competed at the 1992 World University Orienteering Championships in Aberdeen.

Her best result in the World Championships was 6th in the long distance in 2003, she also competed in 2001, 1999, 1997, 1995, 1993 and 1991.

At the 2001 World Games, Bączek was a member of the team from Poland which finished 4th in the mixed relay event and she competed in the women's individual event.

References

External links
 
 Catching the wedding – Park World Tour (2001 photo of Barbara Baczek)

1972 births
Living people
Polish orienteers
Female orienteers
Foot orienteers
Competitors at the 2001 World Games
Junior World Orienteering Championships medalists